Grub Street is a street in London's Moorfields district, and one-time home to impoverished "hack writers".

Grub Street may also refer to:

Grub Street (literary magazine), a magazine from Towson University, Maryland, US
Grub Street, Staffordshire, a settlement in Staffordshire, England
 Grub Street, an online food news outlet of New York magazine
Grub Street Productions, an American TV production company
GrubStreet, a writer's workshop in Boston, Massachusetts

See also
New Grub Street, a novel by George Gissing
Grubb Street (disambiguation)